is a railway station in Kita, Tokyo, Japan, operated by East Japan Railway Company (JR East). Tabata Station is on the Tōhoku Main Line and Yamanote Line and is served by the circular Yamanote Line trains and the local and rapid trains of the Keihin–Tōhoku Line.

Station layout
The station consists of two island platforms serving four tracks, with the Yamanote Line tracks on the inside, and Keihin-Tōhoku Line tracks on the outside, enabling cross-platform interchange between the two lines. There is a south and a north exit from the station.

Platforms

Chest-high platform edge doors were installed on the Yamanote Line platforms in January 2015, with operation commencing in February.

History
Tabata Station opened on 1 April 1896. With the privatization of JNR on 1 April 1987, the station came under the control of JR East. The station was rebuilt between 2005 and August 2008.

Station numbering was introduced in 2016 with Tabata being assigned station numbers JY09 for the Yamanote line and JK34 for the Keihin-Tōhoku line.

Passenger statistics
In fiscal 2013, the station was used by an average of 45,116 passengers daily (boarding passengers only), making it the 98th busiest station on the JR East network. The passenger figures for previous years are as shown below.

Surrounding area
 
 Tokyo Women's Medical University

See also

 List of railway stations in Japan

References

External links

 JR East station information 

Yamanote Line
Keihin-Tōhoku Line
Stations of East Japan Railway Company
Railway stations in Tokyo
Railway stations in Japan opened in 1896